Redo The Stacks is the first full-length album by Centro-matic. The album was recorded and mixed in Denton, TX by Matt Pence. All songs were written and performed by Will Johnson.

Track listing
 "Pilot’s On the Wall, The"
 "Parade of Choosers"
 "Terrified Anyway"
 "Post-It Notes From the State Hospital"
 "Fidgeting Wildly"
 "The Cannon-Ball Shot"
 "Part of This Accident"
 "Am I the Manager or am I Not?"
 "Cannot Compete"
 "Are You Ready for the Shutdown?"
 "Don’t Smash The Qualifying Man"
 "Hoist Up the Popular Ones"
 "Starfighter #1479"
 "Bitter (Did You Notice That?)"
 "Rock and Roll Eyes"
 "If I Had a Dartgun"
 "Tied to the Trailer"
 "My Supermodel Girlfriend Gone Awol"
 "You’re Like Everyone"
 "Take the Original Frame"
 "Capture the Aimless Boy"
 "Mandatory On the Attack"
 "Good As Gold"

Personnel 
 Will Johnson – vocals, guitar, drums, bass guitar, and piano
 Matt Pence – engineering, mixing, mastering

References
[] Allmusic

External links
Official site

Centro-Matic albums
1996 debut albums